Andrei Bantaş (November 30, 1930 in Iaşi – January 17, 1997 in Bucharest) was a Romanian lexicographer, translator and teacher.

He was professor of English language and literature at the University of Bucharest, Romania.

Together with Leon Levițchi he is one of the best known authors of English/Romanian dictionaries.

The Andrei Bantaş Translation Prize is named after him.

Books (selection)
Bantaş, Andrei & Rădulescu, Mihai, Capcanele limbii engleze – False Friends, București, Editura Didactică şi Pedagogică, 1979
co-author (with Elena Croitoru) of Didactica traducerii ("The Didactics of Translation").

Translations (selection)
Ioan Flora, Cincizeci de romane si alte utopii / Fifty Novels and Other Utopias, trans. Andrei Bantaş and Richard Collins (Bucharest: Editura Eminescu, 1996).
Charles Dickens – Viaṭa Mântuitorului nostru Iisus Hristos  ("The Life of Our Lord")
W. Somerset Maugham – Vălul pictat ("The Painted Veil")
Arthur Koestler- Al treisprezecelea trib: Khazarii ("The Thirteenth Tribe: The Khazar Empire and Its Heritage")
Samuel Butler- Ṣi tu vei fi ṭărână ("The Way of All Flesh")
W. Somerset Maugham- Plăcerile vieṭii ("Of Human Bondage")
D. H. Lawrence- Omul care murise ("The Man Who Died")
Oscar Wilde- Toate povestirile

Awards
Romanian Writers' Union Prize  (1978)

See also
 Trei culori

References
Aurel Sasu, Dicționarul biografic al literaturii române (A-L), Paralela 45, 2006
Ioana Ieronim, Secolul 20, nr. 1-2, 1975
V. Stanciu, in Cahiers roumains d'études littéraires, nr. 3, 1977
Maria-Ana Tupan, in România literarǎ, nr. 49, 1990
Irina Petraș, in Contemporanul, nr. 25, 2001

1930 births
1997 deaths
Academic staff of the University of Bucharest
Romanian translators
20th-century translators